Julie Carp (also Jones) is a fictional character from the British ITV soap opera Coronation Street, played by Katy Cavanagh. The character debuted on-screen during the episode airing on 25 April 2008 and was originally introduced as a new girlfriend of established character Kirk Sutherland (Andrew Whyment) and in a later storyline she was revealed to be Eileen Grimshaw's (Sue Cleaver) half-sister. On 4 February 2015, it was announced that Cavanagh had decided not to renew her contract with the show in order to go and pursue other projects. She departed on 3 July 2015.

Creation
The character of Julie Carp was initially introduced as love interest of established character Kirk Sutherland (Andrew Whyment). Julie became a "permanent fixture" in the serial and was soon developed into the roles of a machinist and later a supervisor at the Underworld factory. In another storyline Julie has a pregnancy scare. In an "emotional" episode Kirk finds her pregnancy test with Julie under the impression that she was pregnant. A spokesperson for Coronation Street said that Kirk would have been one of the show's most unlikely fathers and would have doted on their child.

In 2009 producers decided to put Julie at the forefront of storylines. They separated her from Kirk and cast Sharon Duce to play her mother Paula Carp; who was introduced on a temporary basis to accommodate one particular storyline. Coronation Street's producer Kim Crowther had previously told Kris Green of Digital Spy of her intentions to implement a storyline which would connect the characters of Julie, Eileen Grimshaw (Sue Cleaver) and Rita Sullivan (Barbara Knox).

Development

Characterisation
During an interview with media website Digital Spy, Cavanagh spoke about the rise of her character into the main storylines during 2009, providing further insight into how her character's personality was panning out, stating: "It's taken me a year but I've been quite lucky because I crept in at the back and pottered around for a bit, finding my feet. I was definitely ready to get my teeth into something. I'm so chuffed with it. I've loved it. It's nice to show a different side to Julie and discover what's behind her slightly manic positivity." During the same interview she also commented on her character being a lonely woman because of all the events of the past year.

In mid-2009, Cavanagh spoke about her character in more depth, saying: "Three words to describe Julie – sparkly, romantic and sagacious", going on to say "I don't think anything irritates me about Julie, erm, I couldn't play her if anything irritated me, she does talk a lot so sometimes I'm completely knackered by the end of the day of playing Julie and I just want to go home and moan for an hour" and also that "My favourite quality about Julie is her sense of kind of fun and her irrepressible kind of joy, I love playing that".

Relationships
The Daily Star later ran a story revealing that Jason's grandfather, Colin Grimshaw (Edward de Souza), is Julie's biological father. Julie and Jason get drunk together after both splitting from their partners and Julie accompanies Jason back to his home where the situation becomes passionate. A spokesperson said that they do not realise they are doing any harm because they are "both adults and both single". The revelation of Julie's paternity leaves the pair "horrified" and "rocked to the core". They also said that "Colin confesses to gob-smacked drinkers in the Rovers Return that he took advantage of daughter Eileen’s 14-year-old school pal Paula Carp and got her pregnant." The publication's columnist stated that they knew whether or not Julie and Jason had sex, but Coronation Street wanted to keep it a secret until transmission.

Crowther told Green that they planned to keep Julie involved in Eileen's storylines. She added that Julie wants to be part of the Grimshaw family and "she's not going to let Eileen forget it".

Commenting on the character's keen attitude towards not being single actress Katy Cavanagh said: "She's lonely and I'm sure she'd rip the head off of any man that comes within five miles of her." Going on to say that although her character was no longer with Kirk Sutherland she also commented on their closeness and the fact they still live together so it is like nothing has changed.

Pregnancy
In January 2012, it was announced that Julie was to fall pregnant later in the year. The baby is suspected to be her partner Brian Packham's (Peter Gunn) but he is convinced that Julie cheated on him. Canavagh predicted that it will be "chaotic" when Julie becomes a mother. In an interview with Inside Soap, Cavanagh commented: "Julie will be ridiculous. She'll take everything people tell her literally. It will drive her sister Eileen absolutely mad. Julie will work hard at being a mum, but it'll be quite chaotic. She'll probably end up leaving the child in the supermarket! She'll adore her baby, though – it won't be left wanting in the love department." Brian initially wonders whether the baby is his as he had a vasectomy some time ago and failed to tell Julie. Cavanagh commented "She and Brian have been talking loads about having a child together, and he's seemed really into the idea. The viewers may have been aware that he's been looking a little bit shifty about the whole thing – but Julie hasn't noticed that anything's wrong."

After discovering that Julie is pregnant, Brian accuses her of having an affair because he has had a vasectomy. While speaking on This Morning, Cavanagh revealed her character is unaware of why Brian is not as excited about the pregnancy as she is. The actress said "Obviously they've been trying extremely hard to make babies! It's going to completely knock her for six." The couple visit Matt Carter (Oliver Mellor) at the medical centre looking for an explanation. Doctor Carter reveals that a vasectomy is not always 100% effective. When asked if Julie would forgive Brian, Cavanagh quipped "It's all going to come alright in the end, but Brian's really hurt her." The actress added that Julie has "a lovely goldfish kind of memory".

It was later announced that Julie would have a problematic pregnancy. Cavanagh told Alison Slade from TVTimes that having a baby is "the only thing that really matters" to Julie as it is "the biggest thing in her life". The character's issues develop when she attends her twelve-week scan. A Coronation Street representative told Laura Jayne-Tyler from Inside Soap that Julie and Brian are "quite nervous" prior to the scan but "bubbling over with excitement" about seeing their baby. When the scan takes place, Julie's nurse calls in a consultant and they run some tests. Julie is later told some "terrible news" about her pregnancy that requires emergency treatment. The representative added that Julie is "crumbling inside" and she attempts to keep a "brave face" – but the prognosis that she has been given "is simply unimaginable to her". While Brian acts as Julie's "tower of strength" throughout her ordeal.

Departure
On 4 February 2015, it was announced that Cavanagh had decided to leave Coronation Street. She revealed that she wanted to secure other roles and would be willing to return to the show in the future. Julie's exit story saw her leave Weatherfield following the breakdown of her relationship with Dev Alahan (Jimmi Harkishin). Peter Gunn returned to the show as Brian in the build-up to her exit. Her final episode aired on 3 July 2015.

Storylines
Julie's early storylines mainly revolved around her relationship with Kirk. Eileen strikes up a conversation with Julie when they both ran outside after Maria Connor (Samia Ghadie) crashed her car into Underworld. Julie says that she is getting fed up of her partner, Kirk, because he is unemployed and not doing anything about it. Julie's boss, Tony Gordon (Gray O'Brien), puts her in an awkward position at work, insisting she sack one of the seamstresses, who is also her friends but as supervisor, Tony feels it is necessary to step up to her role more effectively. Tony carries on bullying Julie to sack one of her friends until she stands up for herself but Tony threatens to sack her unless she does the task in hand. She is saved by newcomer Luke Strong (Craig Kelly) who tells her that her job was safe and undermines Tony.

Following a pregnancy scare, Julie tells Hayley Cropper (Julie Hesmondhalgh) that she needs a real man and dumps Kirk. Eileen Grimshaw (Sue Cleaver) pesters Julie by asking about her mother, Paula (Sharon Duce), because they were friends at school. Following her split from Kirk, Julie begins to show an interest in Eileen's son, Jason (Ryan Thomas). The pair get drunk in The Rovers and head back to Jason's house where they have sex, unaware that they are related. At Colin's 70th party at The Rovers a few days later, Paula comes in drunk, urging Julie to stop seeing Jason as Eileen is her half-sister. A few days later, Julie is horrified to discover that Colin has had a stroke. Determined to get to know her father, she visits him in hospital. When he dies of a heart attack, she is distraught and devastated that she didn't have a chance to know him.

Julie starts to work with Eileen's boyfriend, Jesse Chadwick (John Thomson), in child entertainment venues but when Eileen finds out, she forbids him to see Julie, even though they briefly still work together secretly before calling it quits. After Eileen and Jesse's relationship comes under strain, Jesse kisses Julie, saying he has feelings for her. A guilty Julie tells Eileen and the sisters chase him out of The Rovers and away from the Street. Julie and Eileen bond and promise to make a fresh start on their newfound relationship. Julie meets Brian Packham (Peter Gunn) and both are instantly smitten. Fiz Stape's (Jennie McAlpine) husband John (Graeme Hawley) worries that Brian will uncover his identity fraud. They inform Brian's wife, who then interrupts Julie and Brian's date, telling Julie that she is still married to Brian. John and Fiz then tell Brian's wife that Julie is mentally unstable and harassing Brian. She decides to take Brian back, breaking Julie's heart. Julie helps Eileen break in Owen Armstrong's (Ian Puleston-Davies) building yard to obtain his fixed accounts and document so they can use them to stop Owen threatening Eileen who paid a £10,000 cheque meant for Owen into her own account.

Julie and Eileen discover that they are related to Dennis Tanner (Philip Lowrie) as his mother, Elsie Tanner (Pat Phoenix), was a first cousin of their paternal grandfather, Arnley Grimshaw. When John's secrets are revealed, Julie decides that she wants to see Brian again. While on a date, Julie gets drunk and accuses Brian of flirting with Eva Price (Catherine Tyldesley). Despite their following encounters also being awkward, Dennis and Eileen force the pair to talk and they begin a relationship. Julie becomes pregnant but Brian had a vasectomy and suspects Julie of having an affair. Tests reveal that Julie is not pregnant and a growth caused the positive pregnancy test. Julie has to have her ovaries removed, leaving her unable to have children. Julie later becomes friends with Kirsty Soames (Natalie Gumede), unaware that she is domestically abusing Tyrone Dobbs (Alan Halsall). Julie defends Kirsty on a number of occasions, even compromising her friendship with Fiz. Julie becomes suspicious of Kirsty's behaviour and Kirsty slaps Julie when she confronts her. Julie realises that Kirsty is the one abusing Tyrone and tries to plead his innocence but is told to go to the police.

Julie decides she would like to foster children to fill the void in her life and talks Brian into the idea. The pair meet with a children's social worker and Julie is delighted to be informed that she is an ideal candidate. Brian tells Julie that the fostering application has been declined, unaware he withdrew it. Her nephew, Todd Grimshaw (Bruno Langley) tells Julie that Brian does not want to foster and has got a new job in Wales. Upset, Julie ends the relationship but he attempts to persuade her to change her mind and join him in Wales. When she discovers that he withdrew the adoption application, she orders him to leave her alone. Brian then leaves for Wales but Julie misses him.

When Dennis returns to Weatherfield after some time away, Julie allows him to live with her. Dennis comes up with a plan to reconcile with his wife, Rita Sullivan (Barbara Knox). Dennis and Julie stage a public argument which ends in Julie throwing Dennis out as Dennis knows that Rita has a kind heart and she will take him in. Julie is unsure but goes along with it for Dennis' sake. A few weeks after their staged argument, Norris Cole (Malcolm Hebden), is moaning about Dennis in The Rovers and Julie lets it slip about Dennis's plan. Norris informs Rita and she confronts Julie. When Rita ends her marriage to Dennis, he storms into The Kabin and confronts Norris, leading to an argument. The argument results in Dennis punching Norris in the face, causing him to fall over. Rita enters just as this is happening and sees Dennis taking money from the till. She physically throws Dennis out of The Kabin for punching Norris. Dennis then sadly bids farewell to Julie before leaving Weatherfield for the last time.

Julie later begins a relationship with Dev, much to the frustration of Mary Taylor (Patti Clare), who is Dev's children's nanny, who also has feelings for him. Julie and Mary argue regularly until Dev stops them, pointing out that they are upsetting his children. Julie later accompanies the Underworld staff on a trip to an awards ceremony where her boss Carla Connor (Alison King) has been nominated for an award. Steve McDonald (Simon Gregson) is driving the minibus that is taking the staff to the ceremony and he almost collides with some boy racers during the journey. However, the boy racers later overtake Steve and stop right in front of him, causing an accident. Julie, Steve and Sean Tully (Antony Cotton) are the first to regain consciousness but Steve is in shock and flees, leaving Julie and Sean to deal with the traumatic situation. Julie copes relatively well and helps many people out of the wreckage. She uses strips from her dress to help people with cuts and bleeding wounds and helps Sean cope when he has a panic attack. Julie and the other passengers later panic when they realises that all of the staff are safe, except Carla. However, Tracy Barlow (Kate Ford) risks her life to save Carla and nearly falls to her death when the minibus falls over a cliff. At the hospital, Julie is met by Dev, where she breaks down in his arms. When Dev reveals he will be leaving Weatherfield for India for four weeks, he leaves Julie in charge of everything, including his corner shop and children. This news is not taken well by Mary and Sophie Webster (Brooke Vincent), especially when Julie orders Sophie to start work at 6:30 in the morning. Dev eventually takes action, leaving Sophie in charge of the shop, Mary in charge of the children and Julie supervising the two, which she is not pleased about. She later bids Dev farewell, along with Mary, Sophie and the children, as he leaves and Julie moves into Dev's house. Julie and Mary put their feud to one side and become friends, after Julie allows Mary to move in with her and the children, Aadi (Zennon Ditchett) and Asha (Tanisha Gorey) after Mary's motorhome is taken away by the council. When Dev returns from India, but he brings a woman named Talisa Grady (Samantha Power) with him. Julie simply sees Talisa as a friend of Dev's but Mary realises that Dev has feelings for the newcomer. Julie is stunned when Brian returns and attempts to take her on a 3-month adventure around the world. She is frustrated by Brian's romantic gestures and publicly slaps him and shouts at him in front of her factory colleagues. Julie goes to the shop and is heartbroken to hear Dev revealing his love to Talisa. She confronts Dev and Talisa, where Dev admits his feelings for Talisa but she tells them that she is a lesbian, before leaving Weatherfield, and Julie expresses her disappointment in Dev before packing her bags and moving in with Eileen. She decides to accept Brian's offer but tells him that she will be going alone, and not having to endure his romantic gestures anymore. Julie sees how upset Brian is about her suggestion, but he agrees because he wants Julie to be happy. She tells him that he can come with her, and they leave together after an emotional farewell to Eileen, Sean, Jason, Mary, Dev, Aadi and Asha. In April 2017, Julie's sister Eileen returns from visiting her and reveals that Julie has comfort eaten herself to borderline obesity after her split from Brian Packham.

Reception

A columnist for the Daily Mirror opined that Julie "is not everyone’s cup of tea" because she has a habit of talking too much. She owns a "wacky wardrobe" complete with a "ditsy demeanour". They added that people would not normally think that this "chatterbox" is considered as a "sex symbol". The Daily Star's Peter Dyke and Katie Begley said that Julie is just "wacky". Kate Woodward of Inside Soap said that Julie was an unsung character that made the year 2010 in soap opera, "a joy to watch".

Kris Green of Digital Spy said that he was taken aback by the "standout performances" during the revelation that Colin was Julie's father. He added that Cavanagh and Duce's "outstanding performances" made "compelling viewing". A columnist for Holy Soap said Julie's most memorable moment was discovering that Colin was her father.

Inside Soap's Woodward later said that Julie had "been on the shelf for so long she was in danger of hitting her sell-by date". She hoped that Julie would stay with Brian because they had "the makings of a classic couple". A fellow columnist for the magazine said that after "months of mixed messages and ruined chances", they did not think Julie and her "Mr Darcy in a cardigan" would ever get together.

Other appearances
Julie appeared in a stage adaptation of the serial, entitled Coronation Street: Street of Dreams in May 2012. Julie filled the pivotal role of the "Angel of the North"; who guided Paul O'Grady through fifty years of storylines. Cavanagh said that the prospect of playing Julie on stage was "very exciting".

References

External links
 Character profile at itv.com
 Character profile at STV
 Character profile at TVNZ
 Character profile at What's on TV
 Character profile at Holy Soap
 Character profile at the Internet Movie Database

Coronation Street characters
Fictional factory workers
Fictional machinists
Television characters introduced in 2008
Female characters in television
Fictional offspring of rape